Oxton may refer to:

Oxton, Merseyside, England
Oxton (ward), an electoral ward of the Wirral Metropolitan Borough Council
Oxton, North Yorkshire, England
Oxton, Nottinghamshire, England
Oxton, Scottish Borders, Scotland
Oxton, Kenton, Devon, England, an historic estate